Automate is a genus of pistol shrimp of the family Alpheidae, containing the following species:
Automate anacanthopus de Man, 1910
Automate branchialis Holthuis & Gottlieb, 1958
Automate dolichognatha de Man, 1888
Automate evermanni Rathbun, 1901
Automate hayashii Anker & Komai, 2004
Automate rectifrons Chace, 1972
Automate rugosa Coutière, 1902
Automate salomoni Coutière, 1908
Automate talismani Coutière, 1902

References

Alpheidae
Taxa named by Johannes Govertus de Man
Decapod genera